WD repeat and FYVE domain-containing protein 3 is a protein that in humans is encoded by the WDFY3 gene.

This gene encodes a protein which contains WD repeats and an FYVE domain. Multiple alternatively spliced transcript variants have been found for this gene, but the full-length nature of some variants has not been defined.

Biochemistry

This protein appears to act as a autophagy scaffolding protein.

Clinical

Mutations in this gene have been associated with neurodevelopmental delay, intellectual disability, macrocephaly and psychiatric disorders (autism spectrum disorders/attention deficit hyperactivity disorder).

References

Further reading